Tim Walsh (born 10 April 1979) is an Australian rugby union coach and a former professional player. He is currently head coach of the Australian women's sevens team and was previously head coach of the Australian men's sevens team. Walsh played as a fly-half for the Queensland Reds in Super Rugby, and for several professional teams in England and Italy. He is a former captain of the Australian men's sevens team.

Early life
Walsh was educated at the Anglican Church Grammar School in Brisbane. He was selected for the Australian Schoolboys team in 1996, and went on to play for Australia Under-19s in 1998.

Rugby career
Walsh began his professional rugby career at the Queensland Reds in 1999, earning two provincial caps off the bench in the Ricoh National Championship. He represented the Australia Under-21s in 2000 and also played for Australian Universities. Walsh later returned to play Super Rugby for Queensland in 2004 and 2010.

In England Walsh played at Leeds Carnegie in the Guinness Premiership. He also spent several seasons playing in the Guinness Championship for Worcester Warriors, Birmingham and Solihull R.F.C. and Newbury RFC where he was captain. He finished his career in Italy in 2012 playing for Petrarca Padova.

Internationally, Walsh played for the Australian Sevens team for several seasons on the Sevens World Series circuit, and captained the team.

Coaching
Walsh became head coach of the Australia women's national rugby sevens team in 2013, and qualified the team for the 2016 Olympic Sevens tournament. The women's team went on to win the gold medal, defeating New Zealand 24–17 in the final. "It's an Olympics sport and we're very successful at it." Walsh said after the medal ceremony.

In September 2015, he took over as interim Head Coach of the Australia men's sevens team for their Olympic qualification campaign, following the resignation of Geraint John. After the 2018 Commonwealth Games, he took over the head coaching position of the men's team. In 2022 he swapped roles with John Manenti and became head coach of the Australian women's sevens team again.

References

External links
 It's Rugby stats
 Australian Schools Rugby Union
 Queensland Reds Profile

1979 births
Living people
Australian rugby union players
Australian rugby union coaches
Queensland Reds players
Petrarca Rugby players
Rugby union scrum-halves
People educated at Anglican Church Grammar School
Australia international rugby sevens players
Rugby union players from Sydney
North Harbour rugby union players
Worcester Warriors players
Leeds Tykes players
Birmingham & Solihull R.F.C. players
Male rugby sevens players
Coaches of international rugby sevens teams
Australian Olympic coaches